South Eugene High School is a public high school located in Eugene, Oregon, United States.

History
The school was founded as Eugene High School around 1900, and was located at Willamette Street and West 11th Avenue in a brick building that later served as Eugene's city hall. The Eugene school district in 1915 built a new high school on a one-block site on West 17th Avenue between Lincoln and Charnelton Streets.

By 1943, the Eugene School District had outgrown the cramped old high school, and voters approved a bond measure to build a new facility. World War II and other factors delayed construction for a decade, but the current building at 400 E. 19th Avenue was completed and occupied in September 1953. The old high school then served as Woodrow Wilson Junior High School until 1967 (the previous Wilson building was converted to Lincoln Elementary School in 1953).

In the fall of 1957, Eugene High was renamed South Eugene High School, when North Eugene High School opened in the River Road area north of the city.

In April 2018, after more than 90 years as the Axemen, the name of the school mascot was officially changed to The Axe.

Academics
In 1983, South Eugene High School was honored in the Blue Ribbon Schools Program, the highest honor a school can receive in the United States.

In 2008, 89% of the school's seniors received a high school diploma. Of 410 students, 363 graduated, 40 dropped out, and seven were still in high school the following year.

The school has regularly received a silver ranking in U.S. News & World Reports "America's Best High Schools" survey.

In 2010, a student at the school was honored as a Presidential Scholar, one of three from Oregon. A student at the school won the Intel Science Talent Search in 2009 after another South Eugene student placed third in 2007; other students have been named finalists or semifinalists in recent years.

South Eugene High School hosts a branch of the Eugene International High School, which offers International Baccalaureate courses as well as the International Baccalaureate Diploma. The main campus of South Eugene High School offers numerous Advanced Placement courses as well as honors courses.

Activities 
The school has many athletic teams (men's and women's ultimate frisbee, volleyball, football, lacrosse, cheerleading, men's and women's soccer, men's and women's basketball, wrestling, men's and women's golf, men's and women's tennis, men’s and women’s swimming, softball, baseball, cross country and track and field) and other student activities, such as band, choir, theater, orchestra and visual arts, as well as various student clubs.

South Eugene High School also offers a wide variety of clubs and programs. These include Speech and Debate, Alpine and Nordic Ski teams, National Honor Society, Rowing Club, Red Cross Club, Rotary Interact, Black Student Union, Feminist Union, Figure of Speech, Jewish Student Union, Habitat for Humanity, Key Club, Latino Student Union, Model United Nations, Mock Trial, Gender & Sexuality Alliance, Robotics Club, and the Yiddish Club.

State championships
Boys soccer: 1998, 2002
Girls basketball: 1987, 1999
Baseball: 1961, 1962
Boys track and field: 1971, 1972, 1973, 1974, 1976, 1977, 1979, 1980, 1981, 1982, 1983
Girls track and field: 1975, 2019

Notable alumni

 Sam Adams (Class of 1982), former mayor of Portland, Oregon
 Cecil Andrus (Class of 1948), Governor of Idaho (1971–1977, 1987–1995) and U.S. Secretary of the Interior (1977–1981)
 Garner Ted Armstrong (Class of 1947), televangelist for the Worldwide Church of God 
 Phil Barnhart(Class of 1964), Oregon state representative
 John Beckett (Class of 1912), member of the College Football Hall of Fame
 Tracy Bonham (Class of 1984), musician
 Richard Brautigan (Class of 1953), counterculture author and poet
 Chris Carter (Class of 1991), record producer
 Sean Flannery (Class of 1992), saxophonist for the Cherry Poppin' Daddies
 E. Max Frye (Class of 1973), screenwriter and director 
 Neil Goldschmidt (Class of 1958), mayor of Portland (1973–1979), Governor of Oregon (1987–1991), and United States Secretary of Transportation (1979–1981)
 Tim Hardin (Class of 1960), anti-war folk singer
 Rick Hawn (Class of 1994), mixed martial arts fighter
 The Hunches (Class of 1999), rock band
 Jonh Ingham  (Class of 1968), pop music journalist
 Nate Jaqua (Class of 2000), MLS soccer player
 Gerald R. Johnson (Class of 1938), United States Army Air Forces pilot and the fourth ranking USAAF flying ace in the Pacific during World War II
 Ben Kaplan (Class of 1995), author
 Mat Kearney (Class of 1997), singer and songwriter
 John Kitzhaber (Class of 1965), Governor of Oregon (1995–2003, 2011–2015)
 Mike Lafferty (Class of 1966), World Cup alpine ski racer, 1972 Olympian
 Dustin Lanker (Class of 1993), keyboardist for the Cherry Poppin' Daddies and the Mad Caddies
 Boseko Lokombo, professional football player
 Bill McChesney (Class of 1977), 1980 Olympian in track and field
 Miguel McKelvey (Class of 1992), co-founder of WeWork
 Jason Moss (Class of 1986), guitarist for the Cherry Poppin' Daddies
 Charlotte Plummer Owen, bandleader and clarinetist
 Julie Payne (Class of 1964), actress
 Edwin J. Peterson (Class of 1947), Oregon Supreme Court Chief Justice
 Paul Pierson (Class of 1977), political scientist, author
 Rock n Roll Soldiers (Class of 2001), rock band
 Brian Rowe (Class of 2006), MLS goalkeeper 
 Heidi Schellman (Class of 1975), physicist, head of Department of Physics at Oregon State University  
 Dan Siegel (Class of 1972), pianist, composer and record producer
 Paul Simon(Class of 1945 ), United States senator
 Blake Stepp (Class of 2000), professional basketball player
 Corin Tucker (Class of 1990), lead singer of Sleater-Kinney
 Theresa Wayman (Class of 1998), Calvin Klein model, movie actress, keyboardist and singer for Warpaint
 Abraham Wickelgren (Class of 1987), law and economics professor, University of Texas at Austin
 Michelle Zauner (Class of 2007), musician and author

References

External links 
 1955 History of Eugene and University High Schools

Educational institutions established in 1953
High schools in Lane County, Oregon
Education in Eugene, Oregon
Public high schools in Oregon
1953 establishments in Oregon